

Events
Ciro Terranova, former leader of the Morello crime family, is arrested for vagrancy in New York. 
January 8 – The Cuban government places certain gambling operations under the control of future Cuban President Col. Fulgencio Batista.  Batista then allows New York mobster Meyer Lansky and his associates to open the first syndicate casinos in Havana. 
February 22 – Newark, New Jersey mobster Gaspare D'Amico is severely wounded in a failed murder attempt (reportedly ordered by Profaci crime family boss Joseph Profaci). D'Amico eventually flees the country and his organization is taken over by Stefano Bedami (DeCavalcante), now answering to the Five Families of New York.
May 11 – Gambler Ferdinand "The Shadow" Boccia is murdered by Willie Gallo and Ernest "The Hawk" Rupolo on the orders of mob boss Vito Genovese. 
June 14 – Francesco Lanza, leader of the San Francisco crime syndicate and father of the future leader John Lanza, dies of natural causes and is succeeded by Anthony Lima.
October 5 – Nicola Gentile, a high-ranking member of crime families in Kansas City, Missouri, Pittsburgh, Pennsylvania, and New York, is arrested in New Orleans for drug trafficking.  Following his release on bail, Gentile flees to Sicily in 1939.

Arts and literature
Dead End (film)  starring Humphrey Bogart.
Kid Galahad (film)  starring Edward G. Robinson and Humphrey Bogart.
The Last Gangster (film)  starring Edward G. Robinson.

Births
Vincent DiNapoli "Vinnie", Genovese crime family lieutenant involved in construction and labor union racketeering 
John Matarazzo, Genovese crime family member
John Paul Spica, associate of Anthony Giodano
March 17 – Frank Calabrese, Sr., hitman of the Chicago Outfit

Deaths
May 11 – Ferdinand Boccia "The Shadow", New York mobster and gambler 
June 14 – Francesco Lanza, leader of the San Francisco crime syndicate and father of the future leader John Lanza

Organized crime
Years in organized crime